Peter D. Simons,  (born May 29, 1964) is a Canadian businessman. He was the President and Chief Executive Officer of La Maison Simons. Now  serves in these positions.

Early life and education
The third of four children, Simons was born in Quebec City to Gordon Donald Simons and Barbara Lynne Schneider.

Simons studied pure science at Carleton University, and then economics at the Richard Ivey School of Business at the University of Western Ontario, where he received an Honours Business Administration undergraduate degree.

Career

Peter Simons began working at La Maison Simons in 1986. Simons and his brother Richard took over the business in 1996, becoming the fifth generation of the Simons family to run the store. Under Peter and Richard Simons, La Maison Simons expanded outside of Quebec City for the first time, opening stores in Sherbrooke and Montreal in 1999, Saint-Bruno-de-Montarville in 2001, Laval in 2002 and Anjou, Quebec in August 2013.

Upon a visit to Paris, Simons discovered one of the seven existing Fontaine de Tourny pieces in an antique shop. The fountain was once located in the Allées de Tourny in Bordeaux. Simons had the fountain restored on Île d’Orléans. He donated it to Quebec City as a gift for its 400th anniversary, and had it installed in front of the National Assembly of Quebec in July 2007.

Honours
Peter Simons was recognized as a Knight of the National Order of Quebec in 2008.

References

Living people
1964 births
People from Quebec City
Knights of the National Order of Quebec
Members of the Order of Canada
Businesspeople from Quebec
Anglophone Quebec people
Canadian people of Scottish descent
Carleton University alumni
University of Western Ontario alumni